Marc Ferland is a Canadian former competitive figure skater. He is the 1984 World Junior silver medalist. He retired from competition in the 1980s and later started a singing career. He sang the Canadian national anthem during the opening ceremony at the 2007 Skate Canada International and the finale "This is the Moment" during the figure skating exhibition gala at the 2010 Winter Olympics in Vancouver, British Columbia, Canada.

Competitive highlights

References

Canadian male single skaters
Living people
Sportspeople from Quebec
World Junior Figure Skating Championships medalists
Year of birth missing (living people)